Pleasant Valley is an unincorporated community in Tillamook County, Oregon, United States. It is located about seven miles south of Tillamook, on U.S. Route 101.

The community was probably named for the pleasant surroundings. However a local resident who wrote to the compiler of Oregon Geographic Names commented that the place "should have been called Wrangletown because of the disputes and feuds among the residents." As of 1993, there was little in the community but a country store.

References

Unincorporated communities in Tillamook County, Oregon
Unincorporated communities in Oregon